Das Geheimnis meines Vaters (The Secret of My Father) is a German television series.

External links
 

German telenovelas
2006 German television series debuts
2006 German television series endings
German-language television shows
Das Erste telenovelas